Bram Stoker's Dracula for the Game Boy is a 1993 video game that bears a closer resemblance to platform games such as Super Mario Land than horror films. It was voted to be the 21st worst video game of all time according to FLUX magazine though it was also voted best-underrated gem game by 6y magazine.

Summary

While based on the 1992 film of the same name, the game had very little to do with the actual movie. Several weapons can be used; ranging from the basic knife to the advanced shotgun weapon.

The 16-bit renditions of the game were straightforward hack and slash games where players had to slash generic enemies in order to get to Dracula. There is a time limit that forces players to move quickly around the levels. Each chapter of the game starts off with a cover from a book. Checkpoints are used to maintain progress in a level after losing a life. Each level has a daytime and nighttime equivalent. A boss appears at the end of each night time level in order to test the playing skills and to reinforce the concepts that were taught in the daytime version of the level.

The player controls a young lawyer named Jonathan Harker. Harker must free himself from Dracula's capture, follow him to London, and end his reign of terror.

References

External links
Bram Stroker's Dracula at MobyGames
Bram Stoker's Dracula at GameFAQs

1993 video games
1990s horror video games
Action video games
Game Boy games
Game Boy-only games
Side-scrolling platform games
Video games based on films
Video games based on adaptations
Video games based on Dracula
Video games scored by Jeroen Tel
Video games developed in the United Kingdom